Santiago Medrano (born 6 May 1996) is an Argentine rugby union player.  His position of choice is prop. He most recently played for Worcester Warriors in Premiership Rugby until their holding company was liquidated and all Warriors players had their contracts terminated on 5 October 2022.

References

External links
 

Jaguares (Super Rugby) players
Rugby union props
Argentine rugby union players
1996 births
Living people
Club de Regatas Bella Vista players
Argentina international rugby union players
Western Force players
Rugby union players from Buenos Aires